Soumendra Mohan Patnaik (or S. M. Patnaik) is an Indian academic and the current vice-chancellor of Utkal University, Odisha, India.

Education 
Patnaik pursued his Ph. D in anthropology in 1994 from University of Delhi. He also pursued M.Sc (1983) and M. Phil (1986) in anthropology from the same university.

Career 
Patnaik is a professor of anthropology and has experience of teaching for more than two decades. In July 2017 Patnaik was appointed as the vice-chancellor of Utkal University, India. He replaced Ashok Das in this position. Before that he was working as a professor of anthropology at University of Delhi. He held the president's position at Indian Anthropological Association.

Publications 
Patnaik has authored 3 books and has published more than 30 research papers. The books he has written are:
 Culture, Identity and Development 
 Displacement, rehabilitation, and social change: the case of the Paraja highlanders 
 Indian Tribes and the Mainstream

References

External links 
 Soumendra Mohan Patnaik biography at University of Delhi website

Living people
Academic staff of Delhi University
Academic staff of Utkal University
Indian anthropologists
Delhi University alumni
Year of birth missing (living people)